Asahel Green Farm is a historic home located at Middlesex in Yates County, New York. This Greek Revival-style structure was built about 1855 and features the two-by-two-bay, -story central block and single-story wing with porch and entrance.

It was listed on the National Register of Historic Places in 1994.

References

Houses on the National Register of Historic Places in New York (state)
Greek Revival houses in New York (state)
Houses completed in 1855
Houses in Yates County, New York
National Register of Historic Places in Yates County, New York